Cheaper to Keep Her may refer to:

 "Cheaper to Keep Her" (Johnnie Taylor song), a 1973 R&B-song performed by Johnnie Taylor, written by Mack Rice and released by Stax Records
 "Cheaper to Keep Her" (song), a song by Canadian country music artist Aaron Lines
 Cheaper to Keep Her (film), a 1981 comedy film directed by Ken Annakin